The Blue Whale of Catoosa is a waterfront structure, just east of the American town of Catoosa, Oklahoma, and it has become one of the most recognizable attractions on old Route 66.

Creation
Hugh Davis built the Blue Whale in the early 1970s as a surprise anniversary gift to his wife Zelta, who collected whale figurines. The Blue Whale and its pond became a favored swimming hole for both locals and travelers along Route 66 alike.

Originally, the pond surrounding the massive Blue Whale was spring fed and intended only for family use. However, as many locals began to come to enjoy its waters, Davis brought in tons of sand, built picnic tables, hired life guards, and opened it to the public.

Public attraction

Originally calling it Nature's Acres, Mr. Davis continued to add to the roadside attraction until it eventually included The Fun and Swim Blue Whale and the A.R.K. (Animal Reptile Kingdom). The attraction also featured Hugh's brother-in-law, Indian Chief Wolf-Robe Hunt, a full blooded Acoma Indian, who was famous in his own right for his Indian paintings and as a highly skilled silversmith. Chief Wolf-Robe Hunt once ran the Arrowood Trading post across the highway from the Blue Whale attraction.

By 1988, the Davises were not able to continue managing the attraction, so they closed it to the public. Davis died in January 1990, followed by his wife Zelta in 2001. The park soon fell into disrepair, crumbling from neglect and weather. However, after a decade the people of Catoosa and employees of the Hampton Inn launched a fund-raising and volunteer effort to restore the Route 66 landmark. The Blue Whale was restored and repainted to its original brilliant blue. The adjacent picnic area has also been restored.

Popular culture
On July 15, 2002, the Blue Whale made a national appearance in the syndicated comic strip Zippy the Pinhead.

On the British television series An Idiot Abroad, it was shown in season 2 episode 6 when they go to Route 66.

The attraction served as an inspiration for the 2005 Noah Baumbach film The Squid and the Whale.

On September 20, 2015, the Blue Whale was featured on the Food Network show, The Great Food Truck Race" (season 6, episode 5, "Roadside Attractions").

On January 13, 2016, the Blue Whale was highlighted in an episode of American Pickers in an episode entitled "On the Road Again".

On November 11, 2016, the Blue Whale was the third location to sell Snapchat's new Spectacles.

In September 2018, the Blue Whale was featured in a television advertisement for the 2019 Mercedes-Benz GLC titled "Attractions".

In December 2021, the story of the Blue Whale's origin was featured in a television advertisement for Phillips 66 as part of their "Live to the Full" series.

Gallery

References

External links
 Architecture of the Blue Whale
 Legends of America
 Blue Whale of Route 66

1970s architecture in the United States
1970s establishments in Oklahoma
Buildings and structures in Rogers County, Oklahoma
Landmarks in Oklahoma
Novelty buildings in Oklahoma
Roadside attractions in Oklahoma
Tourist attractions along U.S. Route 66
Tourist attractions in Rogers County, Oklahoma
U.S. Route 66 in Oklahoma
Whales in art